Gare d'Austerlitz is a station on the Paris Métro, serving line 5 and forming the eastern terminus of line 10 in the 5th and the 13th arrondissements. The Line 5 station hall, "probably the most atypical of the Paris Métro", is open to the exterior though under the roof of the mainline Gare d'Austerlitz and forms part of a sinuous elevated section which has been "considered an exceptional work of urban railway insertion".

History
 The station was opened on 26 April 1931 with the opening of the original section of line 5 between Place d'Italie and Gare d'Orléans, as Gare d'Austerlitz was then known. It was the northern terminus of the line until it was extended to Quai de la Rapée (then called Place Mazas) on 13 July 1906. The line 10 platforms opened on 12 July 1939 when the line was extended from Jussieu. The station was originally named the Gare d'Orléans after the main station of the Chemin de Fer de Paris à Orléans company, which had opened a line from Paris to the south, via Orléans. The metro station was renamed Gare d'Orléans-Austerlitz on 15 October 1930 and with its current name on 25 April 1985. These name changes reflect the changes in the name of the mainline station, which was renamed after the local district, Austerlitz, which is named after the Battle of Austerlitz, the most decisive French victory in the Napoleonic Wars.

Passenger services

Access
The station has several entrances:
 Arrivals and departures Grandes Lignes: escalators and stairs in the station, by RER C
 Boulevard de l'Hôpital, Rue Buffon side: a staircase at 2 Boulevard de l'Hôpital
 Boulevard de l'Hôpital, Rue Nicolas-Houël side: a staircase at 6 Boulevard de l'Hôpital
 Boulevard de l'Hôpital, odd side SNCF Austerlitz station: a stairway Boulevard de l'Hôpital in front of the station entrance
 Departure court Grandes Lignes: a staircase
 SNCF Departure Grandes Lignes Quai d'Austerlitz: a staircase
 SNCF Arrivals Grandes Lignes: escalators and stairs in the station, by the RER C

Station layout

Bus and other connections
The station is served by Lines 24, 57, 61, 63, 89, 91 and 215 of the RATP Bus Network. It is also served by the OpenTour tourist line. In addition, it is served at night by Lines N01, N02, N31, N131 and N133 of the Noctilien bus network. The line offered a connection with the Voguéo river line between 2008 and 2011. The station also offers a connection with Line C of the RER. SNCF trains head towards the southwest of France.

Gallery

References

Paris Métro stations in the 13th arrondissement of Paris
Paris Métro stations in the 5th arrondissement of Paris
Railway stations in France opened in 1906